Ana Maria Bamberger (born 12 November 1966) is a Romanian physician and playwright. She is employed at the Faculty of Medicine at the University of Hamburg.

She was born in Bucharest. Bamberger began writing plays in 2003. She studied playwriting with Stephen Jeffreys at the Royal Court Theatre in London, graduating in 2011. She has collaborated with the National Theatre Bucharest, with Theater Kontraste in Hamburg, with ABC Theater in Prague and with the Davenport Theatre in New York City.

She formed a close artistic relationship with the actress , who performed in her first play.

Selected plays 
 10 Intrebari
 Belvedere
 Noiembrie
 Infractorii ("Criminals")
 Blind date
 Peste cu mazare ("Fish with peas")
 Pietroiul ("The Stone")
 Portretul Doamnei T ("Mrs. T's portrait")
 Sa vorbesc cu tine
 Taxi Blues
 Three o'clock

References

External links 
 

1966 births
Living people
Romanian dramatists and playwrights